Too Late to Say I Love You (Chinese: 来不及说我爱你) is a 2010 Chinese television series adapted from the novel Bi Zhou Chen (碧甃沉) by Fei Wo Si Cun. It stars Wallace Chung and Li Xiaoran. The series premiered on Hubei TV on August 30, 2010.

Chung and Li won Most Popular Couple award at the 2011 China TV Drama Awards.

Synopsis
Yin Jingwan, a young woman from a wealthy merchant family, saved a young man on a train who was escaping from a rival warlord's manhunt. When she returned home, her parents betrothed her to a childhood friend, but her fiancé was put into prison in Chengzhou for smuggling firearms and illegal Western drugs. Jingwan decided to go to Chengzhou to rescue her fiancé, but she did not know that this trip would completely change her life.

Murong Feng, son of the most powerful northern warlord, rushed back to China from his studies in Russia after his father's assassination. Awaiting him in Chengzhou is one dangerous plot after another devised by his father's generals to thwart his succession to the northern territories. As Murong Feng succeeds in becoming the Military Governor of the North, he embarks on his next ambition to unify his country. Amid this furious military struggle, Murong Feng unexpectedly begins to harbor very strong feelings for an ordinary young woman from the South, Yin Jingwan. What will happen when his love for Jingwan brutally clashes with his political ambition?

Cast
Wallace Chung as Murong Feng 
Li Xiaoran as Yin Jingwan 
Qi Fang as Cheng Jinzhi 
Tan Kai as Xu Jianzhang 
Sun Wei as Cheng Xinzhi 
Kou Zhenhai as Yin Chufan
Gua Ah-leh as Old Mrs. Xu 
Liu Dawei as Shen Jiaping
Lu Yong as Cheng Siling
Cheng Jiabin as Senior Xu 
Wang Lanyang as Mrs. Yin 
Zhu Wenxi as Murong Third Mistress
Yao Gang as Xu Zhiping

Soundtrack

References

External links
 Too Late to Say I Love You on Douban

Chinese romance television series
Chinese period television series
Chinese war television series
2010 Chinese television series debuts
Television shows based on works by Fei Wo Si Cun